The inter-Korean Peace House (House of Peace or Home of Peace) is a venue for peace talks between North and South Korea. The building is situated in the Joint Security Area on the south side of the Military Demarcation Line bisecting the area. Before the Korean War, the village, named Panmunjom, consisted of householders.

The Peace House is a three-story structure built in December 1989 and is solely designated for non-military purposes. It is a place where peace talks are held except for the military talks between the two Koreas. It was the location of the 2018 inter-Korean summit in April 2018.

 Completion date of construction: December 19, 1989
 Floor area: , 3 stories above ground
 Location: The Joint Security Area (JSA) of the Korean Demilitarized Zone (DMZ)
 Uses: A place for peace talks at the civilian level between North and South Korea
 Jurisdiction: United Nations Command
 Function: It is a venue for inter-Korean talks. 
 Layout: The first floor has a pair of rooms used for the press and lower-level delegate conferences, the second floor has a meeting room that encompasses much of the available space, and the third floor has two rooms including one for luncheons and dinners. Closed-circuit television and microphones are installed in the meeting room of the North-South Talks, so that the situation can be monitored in real time at the Blue House in Seoul.

Events
The Peace House is a neutral area, and the Park Geun-hye and Lee Myung-bak administrations used it as a meeting place. 
In August 2015, National Security Agency chief Kim Kwan-jin used as the meeting place with the President of the Political Bureau of the North Korea.
On January 9, 2018, Kwon Hyok Bong, director of the Arts and Performance Bureau in North Korea's Culture Ministry, and Hyon Song-wol, North Korea's deputy chief delegate for the talks, met with South Korean counterparts at Peace House then on January 15 at Unification Pavilion to discuss inter-Korean participation in the 2018 Winter Olympics in Pyeongchang, South Korea.
North and South Korea again agreed upon these venues for the 2018 inter-Korean summit which took place on April 27.

Gallery

See also
 Inter-Korean House of Freedom
 Phanmun Pavilion
 Sunshine Policy
 Northern Limit Line

References

External links

The official website of the Republic of Korea
Inter-Korean dialogue

1989 establishments in South Korea
Panmunjom
20th-century architecture in South Korea
Buildings and structures completed in 1989